Baby Buggy Bunny is a 1954 Warner Bros. Merrie Melodies animated short directed by Chuck Jones and written by Michael Maltese. The cartoon was released on December 18, 1954, and stars Bugs Bunny. The story is about a short gangster named "Babyface" Finster (based on gangster Baby Face Nelson) who, after a clever bank robbery, loses his ill-gotten gains down Bugs' rabbit hole, forcing him to don the disguise of an orphan baby to get it back.

Plot
Baby-Face Finster (a.k.a. Ant Hill Harry), a 35-year-old man who resembles a baby, makes a successful robbery of the Last National Bank by the swift use of stilts, dark clothes, a pram and baby clothing. With him dressed in baby attire, he easily evades the arriving police.

Unfortunately for Finster, he loses his money down Bugs' rabbit hole (the pram rolls down a hill and hits a rock) and he gets himself unofficially adopted in order to gain it back. Multiple attempts to grab it (in one instance, Finster whacks Bugs with the bag of money) are interpreted as a baby's typical grabbiness. Just as Bugs is putting the 'baby' to bed, Finster hits Bugs with a baseball bat and the words Bok, Pow, Bang and Boing appear; he assumes the baby is having a nightmare. A supposedly remorseful Finster grabs Bugs and hugs him, saying: "da-da!"

Later, Bugs is trying to watch TV, but gets static interference on the screen instead. Hearing a buzzing noise in the bathroom. Bugs peeks inside, and finds Finster is in the bathroom shaving himself, smoking a cigar, and wearing a tattoo (labeled Maisie, Singapore, 1932), something which starts to disturb Bugs. All of a sudden, the TV connection comes back on and a brief news clip about the bank robbery and an APB for the robber is shown on screen; all this finally makes Bugs realize what is really going on (if the story is assumed to take place in 1954, the date of the cartoon's release, Ant Hill Harry would have been 13 years old when he got the tattoo.  While this is possible, it is probably not what the makers of this short meant to imply).  Bugs turns off the TV with an angry expression on his face and turns his eyes toward the living room, where he finds Finster going after the money again.

He starts to play rough with Finster first by putting the bank robber in a washing machine and when Finster is washed up, Bugs takes him out and throws him up to the ceiling. Finster hits the ceiling and falls to the floor, and Bugs picks him up.  At this point, Finster tries to stab Bugs with a butcher knife, but misses and stabs himself in the rear. Rather than crying over his pain, Finster instead murmurs inaudible obscenities over it, causing Bugs to spank him, removing the weapons he has with each blow (a pistol, a hand club, a cleaver, shotgun shells, a hand grenade, and a machine gun). Bugs trusses Finster up in a basket like a baby and leaves him and the money at the police station. Finster does not take it well, throwing a wild temper tantrum while being locked up in a baby-sized playpen in the State Prison, and angrily claiming his innocence and that he has been framed. Bugs ends the cartoon, telling the angry bank robber: "Don't be such a crybaby. After all, 99 years isn't forever."

Voice cast
Mel Blanc as Bugs Bunny, Baby-Faced Finster, Ant Hill Harry, TV Reporter, Sergeant, and Clancy

Production
TBA

Reception
TBA

Legacy
Baby-Face Finister's mugshot appears as a background cameo in Space Jam, along with other Bugs Bunny villains Rocky and Mugsy, in addition to The Looney Tunes Show  episode "It's a Handbag".

The plot of the critically panned 2006 comedy film Little Man was similar enough to Baby Buggy Bunny to earn a Golden Raspberry Award for Worst Remake or Rip-off. Animation blog Cartoon Brew noted at least three jokes from Baby Buggy Bunny used in Little Man.

References

External links

1954 films
1954 animated films
1954 short films
Merrie Melodies short films
Warner Bros. Cartoons animated short films
Short films directed by Chuck Jones
Films scored by Milt Franklyn
Bugs Bunny films
1950s Warner Bros. animated short films
Films with screenplays by Michael Maltese
American gangster films
Films about bank robbery
1950s English-language films